Peter Johan Östman (born 16 December 1961) is a member of the Parliament of Finland and is the Chairman of the Christian Democratic Parliamentary Group.

Early life 
Ostman was born in 1961 in Larsmo, Ostrobothnia. His family comes from Larsmo and Kronoby.

Career
Östman has been a Member of Parliament representing the Constituency of Vaasa since 2011. He is a member of the Grand Committee, the Working Subcommittee of the Grand Committee, the Legal Affairs Committee and the Finnish Delegation to the Nordic Council. Previously, he was a member of the Finance Committee and the Agriculture and Forestry Committee. He has also been Secretary General and Vice Chairman of the Christian Democrats. In 2004, he was a candidate for the Chair of the Christian Democrats, losing to Päivi Räsänen. Since 2013, Östman is president of the European Christian Political Movement, a political party in the European Parliament.

Östman supports the maintenance of Larsmo's bilingual status. He has been given support by Swedish-speaking organizations.

Ostman supports a ban on swastikas in Finland and has voiced concern over the status of antisemitism in Finland. He has also pressured the Finnish government to outlaw Holocaust denial.

References

|-

|-

1961 births
Living people
People from Larsmo
Christian Democrats (Finland) politicians
Members of the Parliament of Finland (2011–15)
Members of the Parliament of Finland (2015–19)
Members of the Parliament of Finland (2019–23)